The Billerica and Bedford Railroad was an early narrow gauge railroad in Massachusetts, built to demonstrate the advantages of a  gauge railroad.

History 

George E. Mansfield, of Hazelwood, Massachusetts, allegedly became an early promoter of the two foot gauge after seeing the Ffestiniog Railway in operation in Wales. This has been a popular idea but Mansfield never made the claim of visiting Wales in any of his numerous writings. In an article in the October 24, 1875  Boston Herald, George explained how his idea of a small-gauge railroad was developed based on the needs of small towns followed the railroad depression of that year. He persuaded the citizens of Billerica of the economies of a two-foot line, and became general manager of the Billerica and Bedford when it was chartered in 1876.

The line was built very cheaply in accordance with narrow gauge doctrine, but rapidly found itself financially embarrassed. Turntables were built at each end of the railroad, and a wye and engine-house were built at Bedford, but no stations were ever constructed along the line. The company went bankrupt and was liquidated in June 1878.

Mansfield, undeterred, went on to promote the two foot gauge in Maine, where the largest network of these lines in the United States was ultimately built. The standard-gauge Boston and Lowell Railroad used most of the B&B roadbed to extend its Lexington Branch in May 1885.  The Boston and Maine Railroad took over the line in 1887.

Station stops on the line along were Bedford, Springs Road, Bedford Springs, South Billerica, Turnpike (Nuttings Lake), Billerica, Bennett Hall and North Billerica. (Only the Bedford and North Billerica station depot structures still stand.)  Passenger service stopped on the last day of 1931 and the line was used as a freight line until it was abandoned from Bedford Depot to Billerica Depot in 1962.  The line was further abandoned from Billerica Depot to Bennett Hall about 1980.

The two locomotives were named after William Shakespeare's sprites, Ariel and Puck.

Rolling stock

See also
Lexington and West Cambridge Railroad for later history of the right-of-way, including use as a rail trail
Sandy River Railroad for later history of the rolling stock
Sumner Heights and Hazelwood Valley Railroad for the experimental railway through George E. Mansfield's backyard

Footnotes

References

External links
Billerica and Bedford history
An 1879 description of its location, permanent way, and rolling stock, 27 pages
Advertising cards

Defunct Massachusetts railroads
2 ft gauge railways in the United States
Narrow gauge railroads in Massachusetts
Predecessors of the Boston and Maine Railroad
Railway companies established in 1876
Railway companies disestablished in 1878
Billerica, Massachusetts
Bedford, Massachusetts
1876 establishments in Massachusetts
American companies established in 1876